Penpedairheol may refer to:
Penpedairheol, Caerphilly, Wales
Penpedairheol, Monmouthshire, Wales